Kim Roberts may refer to:
 Kim Roberts (poet) (born 1961), American poet
 Kim Roberts (actress), Canadian actress
 Kim Roberts (filmmaker), American filmmaker